Würdig is a German surname, which means ‘worthy, estimable’. Notable people with the surname include:

Paul Würdig (born 1980), better known as Sido, German rapper
Rainer Würdig (born 1947), East German former handball player

German-language surnames